France competed at the 1971 Mediterranean Games in Izmir, Turkey.

Medalists

By sport

Gold
Guy Drut (M) — Athletics, 100 metres hurdles
Jean-Paul Villain (M) — Athletics, 3000 metres hurdles
Jack Pani (M) — Athletics, Long jump
Colette Besson (W) — Athletics, 400 metres
Marie-Chantal Demaille (W) — Fencing, Individual foil
Pierre Gourrier (M) — Weightlifting, Freestyle 90 kg
Daniel Robin (M) — Wrestling, Greco-Roman 74 kg

Silver
Nicole Pani (W) — Athletics, 100 metres
Colette Besson, Michèle Beugnet, Nicole Pani, Odette Ducas (W) — Athletics, 4 × 100 metres relay
Christian Noël (M) — Fencing, Individual foil
Gérard Dellocque (M) — Fencing, Individual sabre
Aimé Terme (M) — Weightlifting, 75 kg
Jean Michon (M) — Weightlifting, +110 kg
Théodule Toulotte (M) — Wrestling, Freestyle 62 kg 
Daniel Robin (M) — Wrestling, Freestyle 82 kg
Théodule Toulotte (M) — Wrestling, Greco-Roman 62 kg

Bronze
Yves Brouzet (M) — Athletics, Shot put
Michèle Beugnet (W) — Athletics, 100 metres
Colette Besson (W) — Athletics, 800 metres
Domingo Onésime (M) — Boxing, 54 kg
Jean-Pierre Younsi (M) — Boxing, 63.5 kg
François Jeanne (M) — Fencing, Individual épée
Guy Fougeret (M) — Weightlifting 56 kg

References

External links
Official report of the 1971 Mediterranean Games

Nations at the 1971 Mediterranean Games
1971
Mediterranean Games